A Russian Travel Document is a biometric refugee travel document issued for international travel purpose by the Ministry of Internal Affairs of the Russian Federation to individuals recognised as refugees residing in Russia under the 1951 Convention Relating to the Status of Refugees.

The Russian travel document enables the holder to leave Russia, to travel outside Russia (with limitations) and to re-enter Russia. However, this document is not a regular Russian passport.

See also 
 Travel document

References 

International travel documents
Refugee travel documents